Deeply Rooted is the eleventh studio album by American rapper Scarface. The album was released on September 4, 2015. The album features guest appearances from Papa Reu, Z-Ro, Rush Davis, Akon, Nas, Rick Ross, John Legend, Avant and CeeLo Green.

Critical response

Deeply Rooted received generally positive reviews from music critics. Aaron McKrell of HipHopDX said, "Musically, Deeply Rooted is low-key, superbly playing to Scarface's strengths. Piano loops and thick drums draw in the listener while allowing Scarface to take center stage on several tracks, providing the album with a cohesive feel without sounding repetitive." Erin Lowers of Exclaim! said, "Although Deeply Rooted may not hold up to previous albums in the grand scheme of his discography, the veteran once again planted seeds for his legacy to grow."

Commercial performance
The album debuted at number 11 on the Billboard 200, selling 22,180 copies in the United States.

Track listing

Charts

Weekly charts

Year-end charts

References

2015 albums
Scarface (rapper) albums
Albums produced by Nottz
Albums produced by Mike Dean (record producer)
Albums produced by N.O. Joe